Hoyer or Høyer can refer to:

People
 Surname
 Anna Ovena Hoyer (1584-1655), German-born writer and poet, active in Sweden
 Arne Høyer (1928-2010), Danish sprint canoeist who competed in the 1960 Summer Olympics
 Bizzie Høyer (1888-1971), Danish painter and art teacher
 Bjarne Hoyer (1912-1991), Danish composer
 Brian Hoyer (born 1985), American football quarterback
 Claus Høyer (1891-1923), Norwegian rower who competed in the 1912 Summer Olympics
 Cornelius Høyer (1741-1804), Danish painter
 Craig Hoyer (born 1960), Australian rules footballer 
 Didier Hoyer (born 1961), French sprint canoeist
 Dore Hoyer (1911-1967), German expressionist dancer and choreographer
 Doug Hoyer (active since 2003), Canadian pop-rock artist
 Elizabeth Hoyer-Millar (1910-1984), British naval officer
 Eric G. Hoyer (1898-1990), American interior designer and politician in Minnesota
 Henryk Ferdynand Hoyer (1864–1947), Polish comparative anatomist
 Henryk Fryderyk Hoyer (1834–1907), Polish histologist
 Gurth Hoyer-Millar (1929-2014), Scottish rugby union international and first-class cricketer
 Hans Hoyer (1890-1917), German artilleryman and fighter ace in World War I
 Harald Hoyer (born 1971), German-Austrian computer programmer and photographer
 Hein Hoyer (–1447), German statesman and mayor of Hamburg
 Ida Hegazi Høyer (born 1981), Norwegian writer
 Jed Hoyer (born 1973), American general manager of MLB clubs
 Jimmy Høyer (born 1978), Danish footballer
 Johann Adam Hoyer (died 1838), Austrian clockmaker
 Johannes Høyer (1883 – after 1939), Norwegian judge and politician
 Luidjino Hoyer (born 1988), Curaçaoan footballer
 Mario Hoyer (born 1965), bobsledder who competed for East Germany in the 1988 Winter Olympics
 Peter Lichtner-Hoyer (born 1925), Austrian sportsman who competed in the 1956 and 1960 Summer Olympics
 Saimi Hoyer (born 1974), Finnish model and television personality
 Steny Hoyer (born 1939), United States Representative for Maryland's 5th congressional district
 Sylvain Hoyer (active 1994-1999), French sprint canoeist
 Werner Hoyer (born 1951), German politician

 Given name
 Colonel Thomas Hoyer Monstery (1824-1901), Danish-American fencing and boxing instructor, duelist and soldier-of-fortune
 Jens Hoyer Hansen (1940-1999), Danish-born jeweller who relocated to New Zealand
 Lone Høyer Hansen (born 1950), Danish sculptor
 Poul-Erik Høyer Larsen (born 1965), Danish badminton player

Other uses
 Høyer-Ellefsen, a Norwegian former company
 Hoyer Guitars, a German manufacturer of guitars
Hoyer lift, a brand name of a device used to move heavy immobile patients
 Josh Hoyer & Soul Colossal, an American soul/funk/R&B band

See also
 Chalmer & Hoyer, a defunct British coachbuilding company
 Fraser-Hoyer House, a historic home located at West Haverstraw in Rockland County, New York
Hoyerhagen, a municipality in the district of Nienburg, in Lower Saxony, Germany
Hoyershausen, a town in the district of Hildesheim in Lower Saxony, Germany
Hoyerswerda, a town in the German Bundesland of Saxony
 James, Hoyer, Newcomer & Smiljanich, P.A., an American law firm